Marquess of Lothian is a title in the Peerage of Scotland, which was created in 1701 for Robert Kerr, 4th Earl of Lothian. The Marquess of Lothian holds the subsidiary titles of Earl of Lothian (created 1606), Earl of Lothian (created again 1631), Earl of Ancram (1633), Earl of Ancram (created again 1701), Viscount of Briene (1701), Lord Newbattle (1591), Lord Jedburgh (1622), Lord Kerr of Newbattle (1631), Lord Kerr of Nisbet, Langnewtoun, and Dolphinstoun (1633), Lord Kerr of Newbattle, Oxnam, Jedburgh, Dolphinstoun and Nisbet (1701), and Baron Ker, of Kersheugh in the County of Roxburgh (1821), all but the last in the Peerage of Scotland.  As The Lord Ker in the Peerage of the United Kingdom, previous marquesses sat in the House of Lords before 1963, when Scottish peers first sat in the House of Lords in their own right. The holder of the marquessate is also the Chief of Clan Kerr.

The current Marquess of Lothian, the 13th, is better known as the Conservative politician Michael Ancram. In November 2010, he received a life peerage as Baron Kerr of Monteviot and so became entitled to sit in the House of Lords. He lives at Monteviot House in Roxburghshire. The family previously owned a larger Scottish seat, Newbattle Abbey in Midlothian, which is now a college, and also Blickling Hall in Norfolk, which now belongs to the National Trust.

The heir presumptive to the marquessate is the 13th Marquess' younger brother Lord Ralph Kerr, who owns Ferniehirst Castle in Roxburghshire, which is the family seat that was restored by the 12th Marquess, and Melbourne Hall in Derbyshire.

History of the titles
Clan Kerr has several branches. The name "Kerr," from the Old Norse "kjrr" meaning "marsh-dweller," arrived in Scotland from Normandy. In Scotland it was rendered Kerr, Ker, Carr and Carre, with a Scottish variant on the west coast taken from the Gaelic "ciar," meaning dusky. According to the lore of the family of Mark Kerr, 1st Earl of Lothian, the name comes from the Norman chiefs, Ralph and Robert, both brothers who came to Roxburgh from Lancashire in the 1300s.

The Kerrs of Ferniehurst claim descent from Ralph, and the Kerrs of Cessford claimed they are descended from Robert. These two man branches of Clan Kerr were often at odds with one another, fighting until they came together in the early 1500s. The Kerrs subsequently also warred with the Scott Clan, until the feud ended when Sir Thomas Kerr of Ferniehurst married Janet Scott. In a 1591 charter, Mark Kerr had his lands at Newbattle and Prestongrange erected into the barony of Newbattle.

1st title
Mark Kerr was created Lord Newbattle in 1591 and Earl of Lothian in 1606, both with remainder to his heirs male. The title went to the eldest of his four sons, Robert Kerr, 2nd Earl of Lothian.  In 1621 both titles were surrendered by the 2nd Earl and regranted with a special remainder to his daughters, the eldest of whom, Lady Anne Kerr, succeeded to both titles on his death in 1624. Her husband, Sir William Kerr (eldest son of Sir Robert Kerr, later 1st Earl of Ancram) was created Lord Kerr of Newbattle and Earl of Lothian in 1631. On her death in 1667 their eldest son became 4th Earl of Lothian (though he was not recognised as such) and on her husband's death in 1675 also 2nd Earl of Lothian.

2nd title as Marquess
By this point Sir Robert Kerr, father of the 1st Earl of the 2nd creation, had been created Lord Kerr of Nisbet, Langnewtoun and Dolphinstoun and Earl of Ancram, and the titles had been inherited by the 4th and 2nd Earl of Lothian's uncle, Charles Kerr, on whose death in 1690 he became 3rd Earl of Ancram.

He was then created Lord Ker of Newbattle, Oxnam, Jedburgh, Dolphinstoun and Nisbet, Viscount of Briene, Earl of Ancram and Marquess of Lothian in 1701.

The 2nd Marquess succeeded his cousin as Lord Jedburgh before succeeding to the Marquessate, and the 6th Marquess was created Baron Ker, of Kersheugh in the County of Roxburgh, in 1821, in the Peerage of the United Kingdom.

Earls of Lothian; First creation (1606)
Mark Kerr, 1st Earl of Lothian (1553–1609)
Robert Kerr, 2nd Earl of Lothian (died 1624)
Anne Kerr, 3rd Countess of Lothian (died 1667)
Robert Kerr, 4th and 2nd Earl of Lothian and 3rd Earl of Ancram (1636–1703) (created Marquess of Lothian in 1701)

Earls of Lothian; Second creation (1631)
William Kerr, 1st Earl of Lothian (1605–1675)
The Earldom was inherited by the 4th Earl of the first creation (see above).

Lords Jedburgh (1621/2)
Andrew Ker, 1st Lord Jedburgh (died 1633)
Alexander Kirkaldy later Ker, de jure 2nd Lord Jedburgh (c. 1590c 1650)
John Ker, de jure 3rd Lord Jedburgh (died before 1670) 
Robert Ker, 4th Lord Jedburgh (died 1692)
William Ker, 5th Lord Jedburgh (1661-1722); later 2nd Marquess of Lothian (title held by the Marquesses of Lothian from 1703- see below)

Earls of Ancram (1633)
Robert Kerr, 1st Earl of Ancram (1578–1654)
Charles Kerr, 2nd Earl of Ancram (died 1690)
The Earldom was inherited by the 4th and 2nd Earl of Lothian (see above).

Marquesses of Lothian (1701)
Robert Kerr, 1st Marquess of Lothian (1636–1703)
William Kerr, 2nd Marquess of Lothian (1661–1722)
William Kerr, 3rd Marquess of Lothian (1690–1767)
William Henry Kerr, 4th Marquess of Lothian (1713–1775)
William John Kerr, 5th Marquess of Lothian (1737–1815)
William Kerr, 6th Marquess of Lothian (1763–1824)
John William Robert Kerr, 7th Marquess of Lothian (1794–1841)
William Schomberg Robert Kerr, 8th Marquess of Lothian (1832–1870)
Schomberg Henry Kerr, 9th Marquess of Lothian (1833–1900)
Robert Schomberg Kerr, 10th Marquess of Lothian (1874–1930)
Philip Henry Kerr, 11th Marquess of Lothian (1882–1940)
Peter Francis Walter Kerr, 12th Marquess of Lothian (1922–2004)
Michael Andrew Foster Jude Kerr, 13th Marquess of Lothian (born 1945)

The heir presumptive is the present holder's brother Lord Ralph William Francis Joseph Kerr (born 1957).
The heir presumptive's heir apparent is his son John Walter Donald Peter Kerr (born 1988).

Family tree

See also
Baron Teviot
Clan Kerr

References 

 , at Leigh Rayment's Peerage pages
 Photo and biography of Walter William Schomberg Kerr, Earl of Ancram

External links
Cracroft's Peerage page

Marquessates in the Peerage of Scotland
1701 establishments in Scotland
Noble titles created in 1701